Palatenda was a 5,300-capacity indoor arena in Milan, Italy. It opened in 1983 and was demolished in 1986 when it was replaced by Palatrussardi. It hosted concerts by artists such as Elton John, Sting, U2, James Taylor and Eric Clapton.

References

Indoor arenas in Italy
Music venues in Italy
Sports venues demolished in 1986
Demolished buildings and structures in Italy